"Country Road" is a song written and performed by American singer-songwriter James Taylor, released in February 1971 by Warner Bros. Records. It is the third single from Taylor's second studio album, Sweet Baby James. "Country Road" is also featured on James Taylor's 1976 Greatest Hits record. The song has been played at most of his concerts since 1970. Randy Meisner, later of the Eagles played bass on the album version.

Background
The song was inspired by Somerset Street in Belmont, Massachusetts, a wooded road running adjacent to the land owned by McLean Hospital where Taylor had committed himself in 1965 to receive treatment for depression. 
Taylor's friend Danny Kortchmar said "Country Road":
captures the restless, anticipatory, vaguely hopeful feeling that plays a large part on James' character and appears in "Carolina in My Mind," "Blossom", and "Sweet Baby James." The road leads away from his ensnaring family: "Mama don't understand it / She wants to know where I've been / I'd have to be some kind of natural-born fool to want to pass that way again." It also takes him away from shattered affairs, prep schools, mental institutions—all manner of traps and bummers. At the end of the road lie freedom and ideal life in Carolina, and "a heavenly band of angels."

Author James Perrone says the theme of "Country Road" is the happiness and freedom of being alone. He noted the theme of solitude appears on other songs on Sweet Baby James including the title track and "Sunny Skies." "Sunny Skies was also released as the b-side of the "Country Road" single. According to Allmusic critic Ronnie D. Lankford, Jr., "Country Road" "perfectly marked the transition between the '60s and the '70s." "This is because the lyrics suggest that it's time for those tired of trying to solve all the world's problems to leave them to Jesus and go away on their own". Lankford said the song's "simple arrangement," with acoustic guitar and "laid back" vocals are well matched to the lyrics.  Music author Barney Hoskyns called "Country Road" "a perfect distillation of the new rural mood" which had become popular at the time.

Chart history
The re-recorded Country Road single version was recorded and mixed at Crystal-Sound, December 30, 1970, and released on 7" vinyl in February 1971. In 2003, the single version was included on CD for the first time on the compilation album "You’ve Got A Friend: The Best Of James Taylor”. "Country Road" reached number 37 on the Billboard pop singles chart and number 9 Easy Listening in early 1971. On the Canadian charts, the song was a bigger hit on both the Pop (#19) and Adult Contemporary (#3) charts.

References

1970 songs
1971 singles
James Taylor songs
Songs written by James Taylor
Song recordings produced by Peter Asher
Warner Records singles